Boy Culture: The Soundtrack is the soundtrack to the 2007 gay drama/romance film Boy Culture. It contains songs from the film as well as the film's score composed by Ryan Beveridge. It was released exclusively on iTunes in April, 2007.

Track listing
 12 Disciples – Ryan Beveridge
 Champagne – Amanda Lepore
 Do U Damage – The Specimen
 Hey Kinky – Fuzz Townsend & Sophia Lolley
 Ride (Blend Mix Edit) – Colours featuring Elisa Burchett
 Don't Get Me Started – Daisy Spurs
 3am – Wideband Network
 Diamonds Make You Happy – The Grand Royals featuring Jill Jones
 John and Andy Flashback – Ryan Beveridge
 Call Me X – Ryan Beveridge
 Last Chance for Love (Welcome Mix Edit) – Joi Cardwell
 Take Me Up (Eric Kupper Mix Radio Edit) – Barton
 Show Me Love (Sand In My Shoes Mix Edit) – Wideband Network
 Making the Grade – Neoverse & C-Dock
 Joey Flashback – Ryan Beveridge
 Gregory & Renaldo – Ryan Beveridge
 The Things I Need to Hear – Ari Gold
 What's Sexy? (Good and Evil Mix) – Chris Willis
 95 – Wideband Network
 Drowning In the Clear - Ryan Beveridge featuring Stephanie Casey
 Andrew, Gregory and Blondie – Ryan Beveridge
 Dinner with Carol – Rodney Lee

2007 soundtrack albums
Drama film soundtracks
Romance film soundtracks